Pussylineidae is a family of nemerteans belonging to the order Heteronemertea.

Genera:
 Lineopsella Friedrich, 1970
 Pussylineus

References

Heteronemertea
Nemertea families